Lyng may refer to:

People
Ciarán Lyng (b. 1985), Irish football player
Derek Lyng (b. 1978), Irish hurling manager and former player
John Lyng (1905–1978), Norwegian politician
Micheál Lyng (b. 1985), Irish football player
Richard Edmund Lyng (1918–2003), American administrator in the Reagan administration 
Richard Lyng (archdeacon), archdeacon in Suffolk, England in the 14th century

Places in England
Lyng, Norfolk, village and civil parish 
Lyng, Somerset, villages and civil parish
Lyng, West Midlands, an area of West Bromwich